Roxanne Cabral is a career member of the Senior Foreign Service, class of Minister-Counselor.  She is the United States Ambassador to the Marshall Islands and served as Deputy Chief of Mission and Chargé d'Affaires at the U.S. Embassy in Panama from 2017 to 2020. After joining the State Department in 1997, she has served at Consulate General Guangzhou as Public Affairs Section Chief (2010-2013) along with other overseas assignments including Embassy in Tirana, Albania (2004-2006), Mexico City (2001-2003), Embassy in Kiev, Ukraine (1998-2000), and the American Institute in Taiwan (AIT). Domestic assignments including public diplomacy advisor in the Bureau of European and Eurasian Affairs (2006-2008, focusing on Balkans issues), and Office of the Under Secretary for Public Diplomacy and Public Affairs (2015-2017).

During her confirmation hearings for the post in the Marshall Islands, she promised her support for Taiwan.  This was in light of the US Senate on passing “legislation asking the government to help Taiwan keep its remaining 15 diplomatic allies, while supporting its international presence.” (Taiwan Allies International Protection and Enhancement Initiative Act of 2019, or TAIPEI Act 2019). During her testimony, “Cabral listed ways to support Taiwan and fight against Beijing’s Belt and Road Initiative, which the US sees as creating debt traps in the countries that join the initiative.”

In 2018, she and fellow Ambassadors Robin Bernstein and Jean Elizabeth Manes were recalled to Washington, DC to “meet with U.S. Government leaders to discuss ways in which the United States can support strong, independent, democratic institutions and economies throughout Central America and the Caribbean."

Education
Cabral has a Bachelor of Arts from Vanderbilt University and a Master of Public Health from Johns Hopkins Bloomberg School of Public Health.

See also
List of current ambassadors of the United States

References

Living people
American women ambassadors
Johns Hopkins Bloomberg School of Public Health alumni
Vanderbilt University alumni
Ambassadors of the United States to the Marshall Islands
Ambassadors of the United States to Panama
United States Foreign Service personnel
Year of birth missing (living people)
21st-century American diplomats
People of the American Institute in Taiwan
American women diplomats